Darius Maskoliūnas (born 6 January 1971) is a Lithuanian former professional basketball player, coach, and politician. He is currently the assistant basketball coach of FC Barcelona, and the head coach of the Lithuania men's national basketball team.

Early life
Maskoliūnas graduated from the first secondary school, in Jonava.

Professional career
During his pro club playing career, Maskoliūnas won the championship of Europe's secondary level competition, the FIBA European Cup (FIBA Saporta Cup), in the 1997-98 season), and the championship of Europe's primary level competition, the EuroLeague, in the 1998-99 season. He won both championships while a member of the Lithuanian League (LKL) club Žalgiris Kaunas.

National team career
Maskoliūnas was a member of the senior Lithuanian national team that won the bronze medal at the 2000 Summer Olympic Games. With Lithuania, he also played at the 1997 EuroBasket, the 1998 FIBA World Cup, and the 1999 EuroBasket.

Coaching career
After his basketball playing career ended, Maskoliūnas started a career working as a basketball coach. During his coaching career, Maskoliūnas has been the head coach of the Lithuanian League (LKL) club Žalgiris Kaunas. While at Žalgiris, he was replaced under controversy, as he was fired during the 2010 LKL Finals series, by the club's then owner, Vladimir Romanov.

He has also worked as both an assistant and head coach with Žalgiris Kaunas' arch-rivals, Lietuvos rytas. He signed with Lietuvos Rytas the next season, and worked in the club first as an assistant; but he became the club's head coach in April 2011, after its then head coach Aleksandar Trifunović was fired. After the season, he once again became an assistant, that time to Aleksandar Džikić. In October 2012, after Džikić was fired, he became the team's head coach again, but he was then shockingly fired by Lietuvos rytas in March 2013.

Personal life
Darius Maskoliūnas has an old nickname "Švarcas", which he gained during his tenure with Kaunas Žalgiris as a player. When he joined Žalgiris, he was an extremely skinny point guard, and due to his second name Maskoliūnas, which is a little bit similar to the English word "Muscles", he got the nickname of "Švarcas" (Arnold Schwarzenegger). More recently, a growing number of online Lithuanian basketball community members have dubbed him ‘’makaluotojas’’ (Eng. one who beats or does something hurriedly, usually without much regard to quality) after his use of the word in an exhibition game to encourage his players to beat defenders with trick moves.

Awards and accomplishments

Club playing career
7× Lithuanian Champion: (1993, 1994, 1995, 1996, 1997, 1998, 1999)
FIBA European Cup (FIBA Saporta Cup) Champion: (1998)
North European League (NEBL) Champion: (1999)
EuroLeague Champion: (1999)
2× Polish Cup Winner: (2000, 2001)
Polish Supercup Winner: (2001)
2× Polish League (PLK) Champion: (2004, 2005)

Lithuanian senior national team
2000 Summer Olympic Games:

Coaching career

Assistant coach
4× Lithuanian League (LKL) Champion: (2008, 2016, 2017, 2018)
2× Lithuanian King Mindaugas Cup Winner: (2017, 2018)
EuroBasket 2013: 
EuroBasket 2015:

Head coach
Baltic League (BBL) Champion: (2010)

References

External links
Euroleague.net Player Profile
FIBA Player Profile
Euroleague.net Coach Profile

1971 births
Living people
1998 FIBA World Championship players
Asseco Gdynia players
Basketball players at the 2000 Summer Olympics
BC Rytas coaches
BC Žalgiris coaches
BC Žalgiris players
Ilysiakos B.C. players
Lithuanian basketball coaches
Lithuanian men's basketball players
Medalists at the 2000 Summer Olympics
Olympic basketball players of Lithuania
Olympic bronze medalists for Lithuania
Olympic medalists in basketball
Point guards
Shooting guards
Sportspeople from Jonava